GFK Ohrid Lychnidos is a football club from the city of Ohrid in North Macedonia. They play in blue and white jerseys at the SRC Biljanini Izvori football complex and its currently competing in the Macedonian Second League.

History
The club was created in 1921 under the name OSK Ohrid. It started competing under the name FK Ohrid in 1946 by uniting all the Ohrid football clubs (OSK, FK Ohridski Branovi, FK Jugoslavija, FK Rashanec and FK Gragjanski). They played in the old Macedonian Republic League in 1948 where they finished in 8th place. Perhaps, the most influential person for the rise in popularity of football in Ohrid was Boško Simonović, who was the team's coach.

Ohrid Arena 
The team's arena is a football and athletics venue with capacity of 5000 seats, located at SRC Bilyana's Springs near the Ohrids Lake bay. It is a venue for football matches of the local clubs and National Athletic Championships.

Supporters
Ohrid Lihnidos supporters were called Ribari, which means Fishermen.

Honours

 Macedonian Second League:
Winners (1): 1993–94
Runners-up (1): 2010–11
 Macedonian Republic Cup:
Winners (1): 1973

Recent seasons

1The 2019–20 season was abandoned due to the COVID-19 pandemic in North Macedonia.

Current squad
As of 23 February 2023.

References

External links
 
Club info at MacedonianFootball 
Football Federation of Macedonia 

 
Ohrid
Association football clubs established in 1921
1921 establishments in Yugoslavia
Sport in Ohrid